P. Mohammad Ismail is an Indian politician and former Member of the Legislative Assembly. He was elected to the Tamil Nadu legislative assembly as a Janata Party candidate from Padmanabhapuram constituency in Kanyakumari district, in the 1980 election. He was the Tamil Nadu Janata Party president during 1980–1984. He was one of the 9 Janata Party parliamentary committee members during the early 1980s. He unsuccessfully contested the 1991 and 1996 parliamentary elections as a Janata Dal candidate from Nagercoil constituency.

Presently he is the Tamil Nadu state president for Janata Dal(S)since 2005. Earlier during 1984-89 he was the Janata Party president for Tamil Nadu.

References 

People from Kanyakumari district
Tamil Nadu politicians
Indian Muslims
Living people
Year of birth missing (living people)
Janata Party politicians
Janata Dal (Secular) politicians
Janata Dal politicians